The 1996  Edmonton Eskimos were coached by Ron Lancaster and finished in 2nd place in the West Division with an 11–7 record. They upset the Calgary Stampeders in the West Final, but lost the Grey Cup to the Toronto Argonauts.

Offseason

CFL Draft

Preseason

Regular season

Season standings

Season schedule

Awards and records 
 CFL's Most Outstanding Canadian Award – Leroy Blugh (DE)
 CFL's Most Outstanding Defensive Player Award – Willie Pless (LB)
 CFL's Coach of the Year – Ron Lancaster

1996 CFL All-Stars

Offence 
 SB – Darren Flutie
 WR – Eddie Brown
 OG – Leo Groenewegen

Defence 
 DT – Bennie Goods
 DE – Malvin Hunter
 LB – Willie Pless
 DB – Glenn Rogers Jr.
 DS – Trent Brown

1996 Western All-Stars

Offence 
 SB – Darren Flutie
 WR – Eddie Brown
 C – Rod Connop
 OG – Leo Groenewegen

Defence 
 DT – Bennie Goods
 DE – Malvin Hunter
 DE – Leroy Blugh
 LB – Willie Pless
 DB – Glenn Rogers Jr.
 DS – Trent Brown

Playoffs

West Semi-Final

West Final

Grey Cup 

1996 Canadian Football League season by team
Edmonton Elks seasons